The Men's marathon T52-53 was a marathon event in athletics at the 1996 Summer Paralympics, for wheelchair athletes. Franz Nietlispach and Heinz Frei finished in gold and bronze medal positions respectively for Switzerland, ensuring that Nietlispach won his first marathon title and also setting a Personal Record. Of the sixty-three starters, fifty-six reached the finish line.

Results

See also
 Marathon at the Paralympics

References 

Men's marathon T52-53
1996 marathons
Marathons at the Paralympics
Men's marathons